Polin Waterparks is  a World Leading Turkish manufacturer of water slides and water parks. They are known for their design, engineering, manufacturing, and installation of water slides, water play attractions and water parks. The company was founded in İstanbul, Turkey in 1976.

History
Polin was founded in Istanbul in 1976 by architect Enver Pakiş as a fiberglass (GRP) design and manufacturing company. More than 3000 water park projects in 105 countries have been completed by Polin. It offers a range of products, including signature rides such as the patented King Cobra, Magic Spheres, Spheres, MagiCone and Space Shuttle and Stingray.

Polin uses a technique called resin transfer molding (RTM) in their water slide manufacturing process. RTM is a manufacturing method that provides advantages compared to the traditional process of water slide production. RTM allows for the product to be created in less time and with less waste, yet is also stronger and lighter than non-RTM products. Since 2006, Polin has converted 100% of its rides to RTM, and can also implement its patented Natural Light Effects and Special Pattern Effects into the product.

Locations
All of Polin's production takes place in Turkey. Sales offices are located in France, Russia, Morocco, Macedonia and China.  Through 2013, Polin completed its manufacturing in three plants located in Turkey. A fourth plant is expected to open in 2014.

Awards
2014 – Cartoon Network Amazone in Pattaya, Thailand – WWA Leading Edge Award
2014 – Super Combo in Aqua Fantasy in Kusadasi, Turkey – Europe's Best Waterslide
2014 – King Cobra in Aqualand Frejus, France- Europe's Best Waterslide by Kirmes & Park Revue Magazine
2014 – H2O Waterpark in Rostov-on-Don, Russia – Golden Pony Award for Excellence
2013 – King Cobra at Aqualand Frejus, France – Best Waterslide Award by Kirmes & Park Revue Magazine
2013 – King Cobra in Aqualand Frejus, France– "Most Innovative Product" in the Entertainment Category of the 2013 Turk Kompozit Composites Summit
2013 – Polin is identified as one of the top-100 fastest-growing companies in Turkey
2012 – King Cobra at Aqualand Frejus, Fraqnce – Best Waterslide Award by Kirmes & Park Revue Magazine
2012- "Export Winner of Turkey" in SMSE Category
2012 – Golden Pony Award for Excellence
2011 – Acquavillage Waterpark – "Best Italian Waterpark" by Parksmania
2008 – Odissea 2000 Waterpark is awarded as "Best Italian Waterpark" due to the new attraction: Polin's Windigo by Parksmania Club

References

Amusement ride manufacturers
Manufacturing companies based in Istanbul
Construction and civil engineering companies established in 1976
Manufacturing companies established in 1976
1976 establishments in Turkey